The Shire of Nebo was a local government area in Central Queensland, Queensland, Australia, about  south-west of the regional city of Mackay.

Traditionally a rural area, producing beef, sugar, sorghum and other grains, coal mining is now a major employer, with eight coal mines in the area and capacity for a further five.

History

The area was first explored by Europeans when Ludwig Leichhardt came in 1845, and was named Nebo by William Landsborough in 1856.

On 11 November 1879, the Broadsound Division was established as one of 74 divisions around Queensland under the Divisional Boards Act 1879. Following a short-lived gold rush in the area, on 7 February 1883, part of subdivisions 2 and 3 of Broadsound Division were separated to create Nebo Division.

With the passage of the Local Authorities Act 1902, Nebo Division became the Shire of Nebo on 31 March 1903.

On 15 March 2008, under the Local Government (Reform Implementation) Act 2007 passed by the Parliament of Queensland on 10 August 2007, Nebo merged with the Shires of Belyando and Broadsound to form the Isaac Region.

Towns and localities
The Shire of Nebo included the following settlements:

 Nebo
 Coppabella
 Elphinstone
 Glenden
 Suttor

Chairmen
 1908: William Conyngham Ussher 
 1927: J. Dillon

Population

References

External links
 

Former local government areas of Queensland
1883 establishments in Australia
2008 disestablishments in Australia
Populated places disestablished in 2008